11 P.M. may refer to:

A time on the 12-hour clock
"11 PM" (song), a 2019 song by Maluma
11 P.M., an album by Penn Masala
11 P.M., an album by Paulo Mendonça
11PM, a Japanese late-night program [ja]

See also 
11 O'Clock

Date and time disambiguation pages